Cardinal Syn is a fighting video game developed by Kronos Digital Entertainment, the creators of Criticom and Dark Rift, and published by Sony in 1998.

Gameplay 
Cardinal Syn is 3D fighting game with free roaming features that allow the player to move around a small interactive stage during the fight, similar to Ehrgeiz. The combatants are designed out of a dark fantasy world similar to Dungeons & Dragons, a great number of them non-human, each armed with melee weapons fitting for the style. The title character gives access to combos, juggles, stage hazards, finishing moves, projectiles and battlefield power-ups.

Small crates found in each stage can be broken open to acquire items.

Plot 
Warfare had engulfed the Clans of the Bloodlands for many generations, each having a great hatred for the other. But one day a mysterious being put a stop to the carnage, summoning all the clans together and read from his Book of Knowledge which spoke of the harmony they could achieve by uniting in peace. For many years, the Clans put aside their weapons and enjoyed peace under the guidance of the stranger they had named the "Wanderer". Then when the land seemed to be paling and dying, the stranger divided the Book into scrolls and gave one to each clan before he vanished before their very eyes. It took no time at all before the Clans were at each other's throats, vying for control of all the scrolls in the Book's entirety and war again fiercely reclaimed the Bloodlands.

In the middle of a particularly brutal battle, a mysterious and powerful sorceress known as Syn appeared brandishing the icon of the Wanderer that he had used as a symbol of clan unity. She coerced the clan leaders to hand their scrolls over to her where she turned them into three inscribed swords which held the knowledge of the Book. She then declared a tournament. Each clan would send its greatest warrior to engage in battles to the death. The survivor and winner of the tournament would be declared ruler of their Clan and given the entire Bloodlands to command, as well as gain access to the secrets of the swords. Yet that first tournament saw no winner, as Syn herself secretly killed the final warrior. Centuries passed and the wars raged on, but now a new tournament is about to be held and the Clan leaders are sending their very best to battle for the rite to power.

Reception 

The game received mixed reviews according to the review aggregation website GameRankings. Next Generations early review called it "a pretty, if confusing, waste of time and effort." Other reviewers, including Game Informer, GamePro, and GameSpot, gave the game early reviews as well, months before the game was released Stateside.

References

External links 

1998 video games
3D fighting games
Fantasy video games
Fighting games
Mortal Kombat clones
Multiplayer video games
PlayStation (console) games
PlayStation (console)-only games
Sony Interactive Entertainment games
Video games about death games
Video games developed in the United States